Olga Čechová (6 April 1925 – 24 November 2010) was a Czech printmaker.

A native of Brno, Čechová studied at the School of Arts and Crafts in that city from 1941 until 1944. She was active mainly as an illustrator, and her work appeared in many magazines and books, both for children and for adults. One of her prints is owned by the National Gallery of Art.

References

1925 births
2010 deaths
Czech printmakers
Women printmakers
Czech illustrators
Czech women illustrators
20th-century Czech artists
20th-century printmakers
20th-century Czech women artists
21st-century Czech artists
21st-century printmakers
21st-century Czech women artists
Artists from Brno
Academy of Arts, Architecture and Design in Prague alumni